Sandra A. Goldbacher (born 1960) is a British film director, TV director, and screenwriter.

Early life and education 
Goldbacher grew up in Hampstead Garden Suburb in the London Borough of Barnet, the daughter of an Italian Sephardic Jewish father, a fruit importer, and a Protestant mother, who was a native of the Isle of Skye in Scotland. Her mother converted to Judaism when Goldbacher was a year old. Goldbacher's father was a Holocaust survivor. Goldbacher grew up as a Reform Jew. She said she encountered some anti-semitism growing up.

Goldbacher graduated from Sussex University as a French Literature major, and then did a year-long course at Middlesex University, studying film and video.

Career 
Goldbacher got her start directing commercials for The Observer Philips, Evian, Wella, Johnny Walker and Baileys. She also directed documentaries for the BBC series Building Sights, and two documentaries on boxing for Channel Four.

In 1994, Goldbacher made two shorts: Seventeen, which starred Rachel Weisz, and Piccadilly Circus By Night. She had made films while in college.

Goldbacher's first feature film, The Governess, starring Minnie Driver, which Goldbacher wrote based on a fictional diary that she wrote, was nominated for a BAFTA award in 1999 for best newcomer.

In 2001, she released her second film, Me Without You, which starred Anna Friel and Michelle Williams and was written by Goldbacher and Laurence Coriat. The movie had been in development before The Governess, but funding came earlier for the other film. Me Without You explores the "over-intense" relationship between two teenage girls. The film was loosely based upon a childhood friendship she had when she was younger. Both films featured Jewish characters and themes.

In 2007, Goldbacher directed the television film adaptation of Noel Streatfeild's book Ballet Shoes for BBC One, which starred Emma Watson.

In 2012, she directed two episodes of the second season of The Hour, starring Dominic West.

In 2016, Goldbacher directed an episode of the TV series Endeavour, set in 1967. Also in 2016, she directed two episodes of the British TV series Victoria. In 2017, she directed an episode of the TV series Anne with an E.

In 2018, Goldbacher directed the first series of the Amazon TV series Ordeal by Innocence, starring Bill Nighy and Alice Eve. It was an adaptation of the 1958 book by Agatha Christie.

In 2019, Goldbacher directed the four-episode Channel 4 mini-series, The Accident, which was created by and written by Jack Thorne, and is about a small Welsh community and how it copes with a devastating explosion.

Personal life 
In 1999, Goldbacher married writer/producer Peter Salmi. They have one child.

Awards and honours 
 1994: Chicago Film Festival, Silver Plaque for Seventeen
 1999: BAFTA, Carl Foreman Award for the Most Promising Newcomer in British Film  (nominee) for The Governess
 1998: Dinard British Film Festival, Golden Hitchcock (nominee) for The Governess
 1998: Karlovy Vary International Film Festival, Crystal Globe (nominee) for The Governess
 1998: Karlovy Vary International Film Festival, Audience Award for The Governess
 1998: Karlovy Vary International Film Festival, Special Prize (or an author debut) for The Governess
 1998: Karlovy Vary International Film Festival, Kodak Vision Award for The Governess
 2001: Dinard Film Festival, Golden Hitchcock (nominee) for Me Without You
 2002: BAFTA, Alexander Korda Award for the Outstanding British Film of the Year (nominee) for Me Without You with Finola Dwyer

Filmography 
 1983: Barbie Dolls and War Toys short film – photography
 1983: Polka Dots and Moonbeams short film – co-director
 1984: Night of a Thousand Eyes short film – co-director, editor
 1990: Brendan's Boys TV – director
 1993: Born to Be Wild TV – director
 1993: Josie Lawrence TV – director
 1993: Conceptions and Misconceptions TV – director
 1994: Seventeen short film – director, script
 1994: Building Sights TV show – director (episodes: "Grand Central Terminal", "John Hancock Center")
 1995: Piccadilly Circus by Night short film – director, written by
 1998: The Governess – director, written by 
 1999: The Devil's Chimney – director
 2001: Me Without You – director, screenplay
 2007: Ballet Shoes – director
 2012: The Hour – director (episodes: Episode #2.1, Episode #2.2)
 2016: Endeavour TV series – director (episode: "Ride")
 2016: Victoria TV series – director (episodes: "The Clockwork Prince", "An Ordinary Woman")
 2017: Anne with an E TV series – director (episode: "But What Is So Headstrong as Youth?")
 2018: Ordeal by Innocence TV series – director (episodes: Episode #1.1, Episode #1.2, Episode #1.3)
 2019: The Accident TV series – director (episodes: Episode #1.1, Episode #1.2, Episode #1.3, Episode #1.4)
 2024: The Reckoning TV series – director

Works or publications

References

Further reading

External links 
 Sandra Goldbacher at Tomboy Films
 

1960 births
Living people
British Jews
Alumni of the University of Sussex
British women film directors
People from the London Borough of Barnet
British women screenwriters
British television directors
Civil servants from London
British women television directors